Shinaki is the name given to the people living in the Lower Hunza, Pakistan.

Hunza Valley has generally three parts, namely "Lower Hunza", "Centre Hunza" and "Upper Hunza".  The lower part includes mainly four villages namely Hussainabad, Mayon, Khanabad and Nasirabad (old name Hini- in Shina and Hindi- in Brushiski).
Historically Shinakis are considered straightforward, brave and loyal. In older times, Mir (The ruler of Hunza) had special army mostly consisted of Shinakis.

Shinakis were the last to convert into  Ismaili Muslims (99% of Hunza's population is Ismaili).

Currently, Hunza Shinaki is composed of five villages: Nasirabad, Mayoon, Khanabad, Hussainabad and Khizerabad. Among these Nasirabad and Mayoon are old settlements, These two villages used to be the first bastions of defense of Hunza in old times. People from Nasirabad and Mayoon bore the brunt of wars and battles of Hunza with Sikhs, British and other forces in late 19th century. There is a gorge where people of Mayoon wiped out an army of 500 Sikhs in a single night. This area is famous as ‘Sikh Mara Jung’. Colonel Durand got wounded from a gunshot reportedly fired from Mayoon Fort. Incessant engagement with outside threat kept Shinaki people in combative mood all the time. The modern stereotyping of Shinakis as straightforward and aggressive stems from the centuries-old tradition. Besides warfare, the region of Hunza Shinaki was famous for its simplicity. The King of Hunza had a special respect for lower Hunza. In the modern era people of these areas are well educated, simple, and financially strong, they contribute their knowledge, wisdom and skills not only in Hunza, but also in Gilgit-Baltistan (fifth newly established province of Pakistan). In recent times Hunza Shinaki has produced some leading writers and intellectuals who contribute in the national debate on social political , economic and philosophical domains of life. Two leading intellectuals of national repute Amir Hussain and Aziz Alidad belong to Hunza Shinaki.

External links 

Examples of Shinaki music can be found on Hunzo.com. (This website also offers Burusho, Chitrali, Wakhi, and Hunzai music.)

Ethnic groups in Pakistan